21 Vulpeculae is a single, white-hued star in the northern constellation of Vulpecula. The star is faintly visible to the naked eye at night, having an apparent visual magnitude of 5.19. It is moving further away with a heliocentric radial velocity of about +7 km/s, having come within  around 4.2 million years ago.

There is some disagreement about the class of this star. Cowley et al. (1969) listed it as an A-type subgiant star with a stellar classification of A7 IVn, where the 'n' notation indicates "nebulous" lines due to rapid rotation. The luminosity class of IV suggests the star has exhausted the supply of hydrogen at its core and is evolving away from the main sequence. Slettebak (1982) classified it as an A5 IV shell star and it was so regarded by Hauck & Jaschek (2000), while Abt & Morrell (1995) listed it with a class of A5 Vn, indicating a rapidly-rotating A-type main-sequence star. It is a Delta Scuti type variable star, with a dominant pulsation period of 0.1881 days and an amplitude of 0.016 in magnitude.

It is about 356 million years old with a projected rotational velocity of 222 km/s. This rapid rotation is giving the star an oblate shape with an equatorial bulge that is an estimated 16% larger than the polar radius. Observations since 1997 suggest 21 Vul has an orbiting disk of gaseous material that is too equatorially confined to make it a shell star. The line strengths from this disk have been decreasing over time.

References

A-type subgiants
A-type main-sequence stars
Delta Scuti variables
Vulpecula
Durchmusterung objects
Vulpeculae, 21
192518
099738
7731
Vulpeculae, NU